Lost Masters Volume 2 is the second compilation album by American rapper and producer Kool Keith from Ultramagnetic MCs. It was released on August 9, 2005, via DMAFT Records, making it his third effort on the label. The album is a follow-up to The Lost Masters.

Track listing

Personnel
 Keith Matthew Thornton – main artist, producer
 Jay – audio engineering
 Mark Likosky – photography
 Jim Rasfeld – graphic design

References

External links

Kool Keith albums
2005 compilation albums
Hip hop compilation albums